Lake Roosevelt or Roosevelt Lake is the name of multiple places:

in the United States:
Theodore Roosevelt Lake ("Roosevelt Lake" or "Lake Roosevelt") on the Salt River in Arizona
Franklin D. Roosevelt Lake ("Lake Roosevelt") on the Columbia River in Washington
 Lake Roosevelt National Recreation Area, Washington
Roosevelt Lake (Arkansas) in Conway County, Arkansas
Roosevelt Lake (Minnesota)
Roosevelt Lake (Missoula County, Montana) in Missoula County, Montana
Roosevelt Lake (Stillwater County, Montana) in Stillwater County, Montana
Roosevelt Lake (Ohio) near Portsmouth
Roosevelt Lake (Rhode Island)

in Chile:
Roosevelt Lake a lake in southern Chile.